Psilochilus is a genus of flowering plants from the orchid family, Orchidaceae. It is native to South America, Central America, Mexico and the West Indies.

Psilochilus carinatus Garay - Colombia
Psilochilus dusenianus Kraenzl. ex Garay & Dunst. - Venezuela, Brazil
Psilochilus macrophyllus (Lindl.) Ames - widespread from central Mexico and the West indies south to Peru
Psilochilus maderoi (Schltr.) Schltr.  - Colombia
Psilochilus modestus Barb.Rodr. - Venezuela, Brazil
Psilochilus mollis Garay - Ecuador 
Psilochilus physurifolius (Rchb.f.) Løjtnant - Venezuela, Guyana
Psilochilus vallecaucanus Kolan. & Szlach. - Colombia

See also 
 List of Orchidaceae genera

References 

Triphoreae genera
Triphorinae